Epanastasis is a moth genus in the family Autostichidae.

Species
 Epanastasis arenberorum Gozmány, 1988
 Epanastasis atlanticella (Lucas, 1937)
 Epanastasis enigmatica Gozmány, 1964
 Epanastasis canariensis (Rebel, 1906)
 Epanastasis eupracta Gozmány, 1988
 Epanastasis excellens Gozmány, 1977
 Epanastasis friedeli (Gozmány, 1988)
 Epanastasis sophroniellus (Rebel, 1894)
 Epanastasis tunesica (Gozmány, 1988)

References

 
Symmocinae
Moth genera